Donal Hunt (born February 1949) is an Irish retired Gaelic footballer who played for club side Bantry Blues, divisional side Carbery and at inter-county level with the Cork senior football team.

Career

Born on Bere Island, Hunt later came to prominence during his schooldays at Bantry Vocational School before later lining out with the Bantry Blues club. He won the first of three divisional championship titles in 1968, before later claiming county titles in junior and intermediate. He completed the county set of medals by winning County Senior Championship titles with Carbery in 1968 and 1971. By this stage Hunt had already made an impression on the inter-county scene with Cork and was the holder of All-Ireland medals in minor and under-21. He was added to the Cork senior football team in the autumn of 1967 and won three Munster Championship medals over the course of the following decade. Injury ruled Hunt out of a starting berth on the Cork team that faced Galway in the 1973 All-Ireland final, however, he claimed a winners' medal after coming on as a substitute. He also captained Munster to the Railway Cup title in 1972.

Honours

Bantry Blues
Cork Intermediate Football Championship: 1975
Cork Junior Football Championship: 1972
South West Junior A Football Championship: 1968, 1969, 1972

Carbery
Cork Senior Football Championship: 1968, 1971

Cork
All-Ireland Senior Football Championship: 1973
Munster Senior Football Championship: 1971, 1973, 1974
All-Ireland Under-21 Football Championship: 1970
Munster Under-21 Football Championship: 1969, 1970
All-Ireland Minor Football Championship: 1967
Munster Minor Football Championship: 1966, 1967

Munster
Railway Cup: 1972 (c)

References

1949 births
Living people
Bantry Blues Gaelic footballers
Carbery Gaelic footballers
Cork inter-county Gaelic footballers
Munster inter-provincial Gaelic footballers